is a private high school located in Sendai, Miyagi, Japan. Founded in 1879 as the Shoso Private School, it is the oldest high in Miyagi Prefecture.

Notable alumni
Seiya Ando
Rui Hachimura

Kaito Ishikawa
Takashi Ito
Shunsuke Motegi
Kenta Murayama
Kota Murayama
Hiroaki Okuno (footballer)

References

1879 establishments in Japan
High schools in Miyagi Prefecture
Educational institutions established in 1879
Sendai
Sendai University
Education in Miyagi Prefecture